Chiefland is a city in Levy County, Florida, United States. The population was 2,316 at the 2020 census.  Chiefland calls itself the "Gem of the Suwannee Valley" and was incorporated in 1929.

History
A village of the Timucua people was once located south of the present city and at Manatee Springs. The area's economy is traditionally based on agriculture, primarily farming (peanuts, watermelons, hay); ranching (cattle, hogs); dairy (milk); timber (pulpwood, lumber, turpentine) and aquaculture (fishing, oystering, crabbing).

In July 1927, a Black man named Albert Williams was murdered by a mob. He had allegedly assaulted a white turpentine operator over a debt he owed the white man, and "was shot to death by a mob".

Attractions
The park offers a full slate of activities, including camping. Manatees can be seen in the spring year-round, but especially in late fall and winter, where the constant  temperature of the spring is much warmer than river water.

The Annual Watermelon Festival is the largest event of the year and dates back to 1954. It is held each year on the first Saturday of June and is maintained by the Chiefland Women's Club.

The Levy County Quilt Museum, founded by the Log Cabin Quilters club, is the only registered quilting museum in the state of Florida. Twice a year quilters organize a Quilt Show for local quilters to exhibit their work at the museum. The museum is open throughout the year and the collection contains unique items like a quilt made from the ties of two former Presidents, Jimmy Carter and Gerald Ford. Open on Tuesday—Saturday, the museum is free to enter and is located just off of Highway Alt 27 on CR134.

Chief Theatre, home to the Suwannee Valley Players, is located off of Main Street and E, Park Avenue in downtown Chiefland. The theatre was built in 1948 as a movie theater till 1984. In 1998, the building was purchased and reopened as a Playhouse due to a historic preservation grant. The Suwannee Valley Players, the oldest community theater troupe in Levy and its adjacent counties, has performed at Chief Theatre for over 37 years. The local theater group presents a new play around every 3 months, these plays include well known titles such as The Importance of Being Earnest and Into the Woods to original plays written by local writers.

Commerce
Chiefland is located in the northwest corner of the county, where Levy, Dixie and Gilchrist counties adjoin (known as the "Tri-County area"). As growth in north Florida increased during the last quarter of the twentieth century, Chiefland became a local center for shopping. A  Walmart Supercenter was opened in 1995, and increased traffic along US 19/98 support a variety of national fast food franchises plus Best Western and Days Inn motels. Georgia-Pacific was a large employer, operating a mill in Chiefland from 1955 to 1978. Agriculture is still a major factor in the local economy, but there has been a big shift to a service economy. There are three incarceration facilities in the area: Cross City Correctional Institution & Work Camp; Lancaster Correctional Institution & Work Camp; and Levy Forestry Camp. They provide a total of over 800 jobs.

Demographics

As of the census of 2020, there were 1,993 people, 905 households, and 511 families residing in the city. The population density was 509.5 inhabitants per square mile (196.8/km2). The racial makeup of the city was 60.36% White, 34.27% African American, 0.65% Native American, 1.66% Asian, 0.10% Pacific Islander, 0.65% from other races, and 2.31% from two or more races. Hispanic or Latino of any race were 2.76% of the population.

There were 905 households, out of which 25.3% had children under the age of 18 living with them, 35.9% were married couples living together, 46.1% had a female householder with no husband present, and 35.8% were non-families. 32.2% of all households were made up of individuals, and 15.5% had someone living alone who was 65 years of age or older. The average household size was 2.45 and the average family size was 3.05.

In the city, the population was spread out, with 31.3% under the age of 18, 9.0% from 18 to 24, 22.8% from 25 to 44, 20.0% from 45 to 64, and 16.9% who were 65 years of age or older. The median age was 34 years. For every 100 females, there were 79.7 males. For every 100 females age 18 and over, there were 71.3 males.

The median income for a household in the city was $17,331, and the median income for a family was $23,750. Males had a median income of $25,000 versus $19,792 for females. The per capita income for the city was $10,676. About 33.3% of families and 36.8% of the population were below the poverty line, including 46.0% of those under the age of 18 and 24.4% of those aged 65 or over.

Education

Chiefland has two public schools: Chiefland Middle High School, and Chiefland Elementary. The School Board of Levy County controls their operation and also supervises two charter schools: Nature Coast Middle School and Whispering Winds. Other schools under the board's jurisdiction are in the town of Bronson, the city of Williston, the city of Cedar Key, and Yankeetown.

The college currently operates the Levy Center in downtown Chiefland. The new location has been designated the Jack Wilkinson Levy Campus in honor of the former high school math teacher's donation of $2.5 million to the campus.

Library
Levy County provides Chiefland with a local public library. The Luther Callaway Public Library is a depository library that receives publications from the State of Florida for public use. The library was dedicated in 1985 to Luther Callaway who was postmaster for almost 30 years and a school teacher. In November 2019, two vacant parcels of land were donated by Luther Callaway's family in hopes of expanding the library facilities. The library is also supported by the "Friends of the Luther Callaway Public Library (FLCPL) Board of Directors group. FLCPL supports the library through fundraising efforts in order to support library programs and resources.

Geography

Chiefland is located at  (29.481801, –82.862097).

Chiefland is at the junction of U.S. Highways Alternate 27, 19, and 98. US 129 was converted into a separate junction in the early 21st century.

Climate

Healthcare

The State of Florida has approved a 28-bed hospital in Chiefland to serve the needs of western Levy County, Dixie County, and Gilchrist County. The Suwannee Valley Community Hospital is expected to cost $27 million, and Ameris Health Systems is leading the effort. The first drawing of the facility was rendered in March 2008.

See also
Fanning Springs, Florida

References

External links

Cities in Levy County, Florida
Cities in Florida
1929 establishments in Florida
Populated places established in 1929